USS YF-446 was an American YF-257-class covered lighter built in 1943 for service in World War II. She was later acquired by the United States Coast Guard and renamed USCGC White Lupine (WAGL-546).

Construction and career 
YF-446 was laid down by the Erie Concrete & Steel Supply Co., in Erie, Pennsylvania in 1943. She was launched in 1943.  Her trials were held on Lake Erie on 26 April 1944, and she was commissioned on 31 May 1944, with a single mast and boom hoist. Assigned to Naval Station New Orleans.  At the cessation of hostilities YF-446 was assigned to the 16th Fleet in Texas for decommissioning and storage.

On 17 July 1947, YF-446 was stricken from the Naval Register and transferred to the Coast Guard.  She was then converted for use as a buoy tender and entered commissioned service on 5 September 1947. She was assigned to the 9th Coast Guard District and was based out of Detroit, Michigan.  She was assigned to tend aids to navigation and conduct search and rescue, limited ice-breaking, and law enforcement duties when needed.

On 18 October 1951, she assisted following a collision between the M/Vs George F. Rand and Harvey H. Brown off Port Huron, Michigan. On 24 May 1952, she assisted the yacht Judy Lane, and on 20 April 1956 she assisted following a collision between the M/Vs A. M. Byers and E. M. Ford off Sans Souci, Michigan.  

She transferred to Ogdensburg, New York and carried out her duties on Lake Ontario. On 28 September 1962, she assisted the tug Russel towing a barge 10 miles northeast of Rochester, New York. She transferred in November 1967, to the First Coast Guard District and was based out of Rockland, Maine, arriving there on 17 November 1967. Here she was responsible for maintaining 417 buoys along the coast of Maine from Portland to Calais at the Canadian border.  She also serviced buoys on several of the major rivers in Maine including the Penobscot, Kennebec, Damariscott, New Meadows, Sheepscot, and Saint Croix. She also delivered supplies, fuel and water to families living at various lighthouses.  Her last delivery to such a location was when she delivered supplies to the crew at Fog Station Manana Island in 1996 while they were solarizing the fog signal.  She sustained minor damage on 16 January 1970, when she touched bottom near Whaleback Ledge, Maine.  She assisted in fighting a fire aboard the F/V Rumble Fish on 5 October 1987 and then towed the F/V to safety.

She was decommissioned on 27 February 1998 and was transferred to the government of Tunisia who commissioned her Tabarka (A-804) on 10 June 1998.

Awards 

 American Campaign Medal 
 World War II Victory Medal
 National Defense Service Medal 
 Coast Guard Unit Commendation Medal 
 Humanitarian Service Medal

References

 This article contains public domain text from the United States Coats Guard Historian’s Office website.
http://www.uscg.mil/history/WEBCUTTERS/NPS_133_HAER_Report.pdf
 Cutter History File.  USCG Historian's Office, USCG HQ, Washington, D.C.
 Robert Scheina.  U.S. Coast Guard Cutters & Craft, 1946–1990.  Annapolis, MD: Naval Institute Press, 1990.
 U. S. Department of the Interior.  National Park Service. U.S. Coast Guard  Buoy Tenders.  HAER booklet.  Washington, DC: National Park Service, February, 2004.  [ HAER no. DC-57; Todd Croteau, HAER Industrial Archeologist (project leader); Jet Low, HAER Photographer; Mark Porter, NCSHPO Consultant (historian), and Candace Clifford, booklet design. ]

External links 

 NavSource Online: White Lupine (WLM-546)
 United States Coast Guard: White Lupine, 1947
 TogetherWeServed: White Lupine Crew Members

White-class coastal buoy tenders
1943 ships
Ships built in Erie, Pennsylvania
World War II auxiliary ships of the United States
Ships transferred from the United States Navy to the United States Coast Guard
Ships transferred from the United States Coast Guard to other navies